Floor & Decor Holdings, Inc., branded as Floor & Decor, is a multi-channel American specialty retailer of hard surface flooring and related accessories that was founded in 2000 and headquartered in Smyrna, Georgia (a suburb of Atlanta).

History
The company was founded as FDO Holdings in 2000 by George West, whose family ran West Building Materials. The company changed its name to Floor & Decor Holdings, Inc. in April 2017.

In the five years between 2011 and 2016 the company doubled in size and revenues went from $277 million in 2011 to more than $772 million in 2016. The company had a net income of more than $26 million in 2016. Floor & Decor was profitable for the five year period before their initial public offering (IPO).

In 2017, the company had their initial public offering with a 53% gain and ended having the largest IPO increase of the year.

In February 2018, Floor & Decor opened a new 1.4 million-square-foot distribution center on a 90 acre site in Bloomingdale, Georgia, just 11 miles from the Port of Savannah.

In September 2018, Bisnow reported Floor & Decor is expected to begin a $160 million expansion of the company that will include 17 new store locations, a possible new headquarters in Atlanta, and nearly $30M in improving its e-commerce and technology infrastructure.

Services
The company’s stores offer tile, wood, laminate, and natural stone flooring products, as well as decorative and installation accessories. The company serves professional installers, commercial businesses, and do it yourself customers. As of December 2021, the company operated 160 warehouse-format stores; and two small-format standalone design centers in 33 states. Floor & Decor also sells products through its online retail platform. During the first six months of 2018, the company opened five new warehouse-format stores.

Floor & Decor Holdings is listed on the New York Stock Exchange and is a constituent of the Russell 1000 index.

Area served
Floor and Decor Outlets of America, Inc. operates as a subsidiary of Floor & Decor Holdings, Inc. and operated retail outlets in Arizona, California, Colorado, Florida, Georgia, Missouri, Illinois, Iowa, Kentucky, Louisiana, Massachusetts, Michigan,  Nevada, New Jersey, New Mexico, Ohio, Pennsylvania, Tennessee, Texas, Utah, Washington, Wisconsin, and Virginia. The company also sells its products online.

References

External links
Floor & Decor Official Website

Home improvement retailers of the United States
Companies based in Cobb County, Georgia
American companies established in 2000
Retail companies established in 2000
2017 initial public offerings
Companies listed on the New York Stock Exchange